Lezgins are the largest ethnic minority in Azerbaijan historically living in some northern regions of Azerbaijan. For most Lezgins, the mother tongue is Lezgin, and minorities have Azerbaijani and Russian as the mother language.

History 
The appearance of many Lezgian villages in Azerbaijan is associated with the relocation of part of the Dagestan Lezgins to the south its territory.

At the beginning of the 18th century, a movement was launched among the ethnic groups of this part of the Caucasus against Persian rule in the region. During the first Russo-Persian war in 1806, the Quba Khanate became part of the Russian Empire.

Settlement 

The territory of compact settlement of Lezgin occupies Qusar District, parts of Quba District and Khachmaz District. Several Lezgi settlements are located behind the Main Caucasian Range in Qabala District, Ismailli District, Oghuz District and Shaki District. There are also mixed settlements where Lezgins live with representatives of other nations. The Lezgin population is represented in large cities such as Baku and Sumqayit. According to the 2009 census, Baku itself ranks second among the country's regions in terms of the number of Lezghins living here.

Quotes 
According to the Center for International Development and Conflict Management at the University of Maryland:

According to Thomas de Waal:

References 

Ethnic groups in Azerbaijan